Mimosiphonops vermiculatus is a species of caecilian in the family Siphonopidae. It is endemic to Brazil and known with certainty only from its type locality, Teresópolis in the Rio de Janeiro state. Common name worm-patterned caecilian has been proposed for this species.

Description
Mimosiphonops vermiculatus measure  in total length (two females and one specimen of unknown sex). There are 96–98 vertebrae and 87–88 primary annuli. The body is slightly dorsoventrally compressed throughout and narrows gently over the first nine annuli. The eyes are partly visible through skin and are very slightly elevated. The mouth is recessed, and the
snout projects strongly beyond its anterior margin. The ground colour is light blue-grey or, after the outer skin layer is lost, darker brown. There is a longitudinal whitish stripe on the ventral surface of the collars.

Habitat and conservation
It is a subterranean species found under bark, logs and stones in moist forest. It is probably oviparous with direct development (i.e, there is no free-living larval stage).

Threats to this poorly-known species are unknown.

References

vermiculatus
Amphibians of Brazil
Endemic fauna of Brazil
Amphibians described in 1968
Taxa named by Edward Harrison Taylor
Taxonomy articles created by Polbot